The Ferens Art Gallery is an art gallery in the English city of Kingston upon Hull. The site and money for the gallery were donated to the city by Thomas Ferens, after whom it is named. The architects were S. N. Cooke and E. C. Davies. Opened in 1927,
it was restored and extended in 1991. The gallery features an extensive array of both permanent collections and roving exhibitions. Among the exhibits is a portrait of an unknown woman by Frans Hals. The building also houses a children's gallery and a popular cafe. The building is now a Grade II listed building.

In 2013, the gallery acquired a fourteenth-century painting by Pietro Lorenzetti, depicting Christ Between Saints Paul and Peter. The acquisition was jointly funded by the Ferens Endowment Fund, the Heritage Lottery Fund and Art Fund.

In May 2015, it was announced that the gallery would get a £4.5 million makeover to enable it to host the Turner Prize in 2017 as part of the UK City of Culture programme. The gallery reopened on 13 January 2017. On 8 February 2017, Charles, Prince of Wales and Camilla, Duchess of Cornwall visited the gallery to view the completed refurbishment.

In January 2018, Hull City Council announced that a record 519,000 visits were made to the gallery during 2017.

Art in the Ferens Art Gallery (selected)

References

External links

Ferens Art Gallery

Museums in Kingston upon Hull
Art museums and galleries in the East Riding of Yorkshire
Art museums established in 1927
Grade II listed buildings in the East Riding of Yorkshire
1927 establishments in England